These are lists of Billboard magazine's "Top Country & Western Records" and "Top Country & Western Artists" for 1950, ranked by retail sales and juke box plays.

Hank Snow's "I'm Movin' On" was 1950's No. 1 country hit based on retail sales and ranked No. 4 based on juke box plays. Red Foley's "Chattanoogie Shoe Shine Boy" ranked No. 1 based on juke box plays and No. 2 based on retail sales. The year's other top hits included: Moon Mullican's "I'll Sail My Ship Alone" (No. 2 juke box, No. 3 retail); Hank Williams' "Why Don't You Love Me?" (No. 3 juke box, No. 4 retail); and Williams' "Long Gone Lonesome Blues" (No. 5 juke box, No. 5 retail).

The artists with the most songs in the 1950 year-end charts were Red Foley with eight songs, Eddy Arnold with seven, Ernest Tubb with five, Hank Williams with four, and the duet pairing of Margaret Whiting and Jimmy Wakely with four.  Billboard also ranked the year's top artists as follows: (1) Red Foley, (2) Ernest Tubb, (3) Hank Williams, (4) Eddy Arnold, and (5) Hank Snow (retail)/Moon Mullican (juke box).

The Decca Records label released 11 of the songs included on the year-end lists, followed by RCA Victor with nine, and Capitol with six.

Top records

See also
List of Billboard number-one country songs of 1950
1950 in country music

Notes

References

United States Country Records
Billboard charts